Jaden McGrath is a former professional Australian rules footballer who played for the Brisbane Lions in the Australian Football League (AFL). He made his AFL debut in round 1, 2015 against  at the Gabba. In November 2016, he retired from AFL football after losing passion to play at an elite level.

References

External links 

1996 births
Living people
Brisbane Lions players
Bendigo Pioneers players
Australian rules footballers from Victoria (Australia)
St Mary's Football Club (NTFL) players